Executive Order 14076, officially titled Protecting Access to Reproductive Healthcare Services, was signed on July 8, 2022, and is the 92nd executive order signed by President of the United States Joe Biden. The order directs the Department of Health and Human Services, the Federal Trade Commission, and the Department of Justice to take and consider steps in their respective fields to protect reproductive healthcare services and access to them.

Provisions 
The order directs the Department of Health and Human Services to expand access to contraceptives, requests the Federal Trade Commission protect patients' reproductive health privacy, and directs the Department of Justice to organize a group of pro bono lawyers to defend women charged with having an abortion.

References 

2022 in American law
Executive orders of Joe Biden
July 2022 events in the United States